In differential geometry a Rizza manifold, named after Giovanni Battista Rizza, is an almost complex manifold also supporting a Finsler structure: this kind of manifold is also referred as almost Hermitian Finsler manifold.

Historical notes

The history of Rizza manifolds follows the history of the structure that such objects carry. Rizza called this differential geometric structure, defined on even-dimensional manifolds, "Struttura di Finsler quasi Hermitiana": his motivation for the introduction of the concept seems to be the aim of comparing two different structures existing on the same manifold. Later  started calling this structure "Rizza structure", and manifolds carrying it "Rizza manifolds".

Formal definition
Precisely, given a differentiable manifold M and one of its points x ∈ M
TM is the tangent bundle of M;
TxM is the tangent space at x;

 Let M be a 2n-dimensional Finsler manifold, n ≥ 1, and let F : TM → ℝ its Finsler function. If the condition

holds true, then M is a Rizza Manifold.

See also
Almost complex manifold
Complex manifold
Finsler manifold
Hermitian manifold

Notes

References
.
.
. In this paper, Shoshichi Kobayashi acknowledges Giovanni Battista Rizza as the first one to study complex manifolds with Finsler structure, now called Rizza manifolds.
. A tribute to Rizza by his former master Enzo Martinelli: an English translation of the title reads as:-"Homage to Giovanni Battista Rizza on his 70th birthday".
.
. Another short presentation of the results proved in : the English translation of the title reads as:-"Finsler structures on almost complex manifolds".
. The article giving the proofs of the results previously announced in references  and : the English translation of the title reads as:-"Finsler structures of almost Hermitian type".
. This article is the one Shoshichi Kobayashi cites as the first one in the theory of Rizza manifolds: an English translation of the title reads as:-"Hermitian and quadratic F-forms".

Differential geometry
Smooth manifolds